Parliamentary elections were held in Slovakia on 30 May 1948, alongside national elections. They were first elections after the Communist takeover in 1948. All 100 seats in the National Council were won by member parties of the National Front. The elections also determined the composition of the Slovak Board of Commissioners.

Results

References

Slovakia
Parliamentary elections in Slovakia
Legislative elections in Czechoslovakia
One-party elections
Slovakia
Election and referendum articles with incomplete results